Richard Bowdler Townsend (26 March 1829 – 10 February 1852) was an English first-class cricketer.

The son of Richard Edward Austin Townsend, he was born at Chelsea in March 1829. He was educated at Rugby School, before going up to University College, Oxford. While studying at Oxford, he made a single appearance in first-class cricket for Oxford University against the Marylebone Cricket Club at Oxford in 1850. Batting once in the match, he was dismissed for 6 runs by William Lillywhite in the Oxford first-innings. He died before completing his studies at Oxford, dying in February 1852 at Norwood, Surrey.

References

External links

1829 births
1852 deaths
Alumni of University College, Oxford
Cricketers from Chelsea, London
English cricketers
Oxford University cricketers
People educated at Rugby School